The 5th Los Angeles Film Critics Association Awards, honoring the best in film for 1979, were announced on 15 December 1979 and given on 9 January 1980.

Winners
Best Picture:
Kramer vs. Kramer
Runners-up: Apocalypse Now and Breaking Away
Best Director:
Robert Benton – Kramer vs. Kramer
Runners-up: Francis Ford Coppola – Apocalypse Now and Bob Fosse – All That Jazz
Best Actor:
Dustin Hoffman – Kramer vs. Kramer
Runner-up: Roy Scheider – All That Jazz
Best Actress:
Sally Field – Norma Rae
Runners-up: Marsha Mason – Chapter Two and Bette Midler – The Rose
Best Supporting Actor:
Melvyn Douglas – Being There and The Seduction of Joe Tynan
Best Supporting Actress:
Meryl Streep – Kramer vs. Kramer, Manhattan and The Seduction of Joe Tynan
Best Screenplay:
Robert Benton – Kramer vs. Kramer
Best Cinematography:
Caleb Deschanel – The Black Stallion
Best Music Score:
Carmine Coppola – The Black Stallion
Best Foreign Film:
Soldier of Orange (Soldaat van Oranje) • Belgium/Netherlands
Runner-up: The Last Wave • Australia
New Generation Award:
John Carpenter
Career Achievement Award:
John Huston

References

External links
5th Annual Los Angeles Film Critics Association Awards

1979
Los Angeles Film Critics Association Awards
Los Angeles Film Critics Association Awards
Los Angeles Film Critics Association Awards
Los Angeles Film Critics Association Awards
Los Angeles Film Critics Association Awards